The year 1945 in archaeology involved some significant events.

Excavations
 Mortimer Wheeler excavates at Arikamedu in Puducherry.

Finds
 December - Nag Hammadi library in Egypt.

Miscellaneous
 W. F. Grimes succeeds Mortimer Wheeler as director of the London Museum.

Births
 January 13 - Francis Pryor, English archaeologist
 February 19 - Barbara Adams, English egyptologist (d. 2002)
 April 16 - Vladas Žulkus, Lithuanian underwater archaeologist
 October 25 - J. P. Mallory, Irish American archaeologist and Indo-Europeanist
 James Peter Allen, American Egyptologist

Deaths
 March 31 - Harriet Boyd Hawes, American archaeologist (b. 1871)
 May 5 - Edgar James Banks, American antiquarian (b. 1866)
 May 31 - Friedrich Sarre, German Orientalist (b. 1865)
 9 December - Alfred Lucas, English analytical chemist and archaeologist, part of Howard Carter's team at the excavation of Tutankhamun's tomb (b. 1867)

References

Archaeology
Archaeology
Archaeology by year